The Bagot goat  is a breed of goat which for several hundred years has lived semi-wild at Blithfield Hall, Staffordshire, England.

In 2010 it was considered "critically endangered" by the Rare Breeds Survival Trust, as there were fewer than 100 registered breeding females in the United Kingdom, but by 2012 had been upgraded to "vulnerable", where it remains as of 2019, with 200-300 breeding females known.

Bagots are excellent, attentive mothers, well capable of defending their kids.  They generally produce a single kid (in common with many native breeds) and seldom require intervention during the birthing process.  Animals maintained domestically and maintained in higher condition than they would naturally manage, often produce twins.  There have been two recorded instances of triplets, one in 1994 (Undercliff Faith, Hope and Charity) and another in 2017.

Description 

It is a small goat, with a black head and neck to the withers/girth and the remainder of the body predominantly white. It may sport a white "star", "stripe" or blaze on its face, with a narrow chin stripe sometimes extending the length of the neck to the brisket.  The white areas frequently sport isolated black dots, with sometimes the black extending as a "saddle" along the back. The head is delicate with either a straight or slightly dished face, often appearing triangular when viewed from the front due to wide forehead and narrow muzzle.  On females, the horns tend to be straight or slightly rearward curving from the centre of the forehead.  On males the horns are wider set and form large sweeping curves over the back.  Unlike domesticated breeds that have been "improved" to have a leg in each corner, they are naturally "cow-hocked", which is typical of wild goats and ibex; being an advantage on rough terrain.  Their top and belly lines tend to be roughly parallel in mature animals (unlike the Swiss breed milking goats which tend to have a triangular appearance), with young (particularly bucks) often appearing triangular in reverse of the milking breeds, in other words deep chested and narrow at the waist.

There are also variants on the pure black/white patterning, believed to be the result of recessive genes including:
 The "Red cheek" Bagot - which sports red/gold "blusher" on the cheeks but not through the coat.
 The "Mahogany" Bagot - which sports gold "frosting" on the outer ears and neck, and sports "eyeliner", "lipstick" and "blusher" again in gold; the coat, whilst black from a distance has a distinct reddish tinge in bright light.
 The "Lightbelly" Bagot - sports dark along the back and muzzle but white eye flashes, throat through to neck, inner ears, underbelly brisket through to perineum, inside and back of lower legs.
 The "Eyebar" Bagot - sports white inner ears, a jowl spot, muzzle, face stripes extending into muzzle, throat patch that does not extend to the neck, underbelly from girth through to perineum, inner and lower legs, 
 The "Lateral Stripes" Bagot - Tan/white patterning to the upper legs and front of lower legs (but not inside of legs), brisket to girth, inner ears, "lipstick" and "eyeliner".

These markings can be identified from historic photos of Bagots at Blithfield Hall.  Whilst some breeders actively attempt to breed goats more closely resembling the Valais Blackneck and actively cull animals they consider poorly marked, the Bagot Goat Society promotes the diversity of markings as critical to maintaining the genetic diversity of the species as a whole.  For that reason, Bagots are not judged based on markings, but rather on conformation.

History 

Bagot goats were introduced to England at Blithfield Hall in the 1380s. They were probably brought back to England by returning Crusaders, and probably trace their ancestry to goats of the Rhone valley. The goats were said to have been given to John Bagot of Blithfield by King Richard II of England to commemorate good hunting the King had enjoyed at Blithfield.

Whilst romantic notions on the foreign origins of the Bagot were widely promoted as true, scientific research, including DNA profiling has disproved any link between the Bagot and the Valais Blacknecks, but rather identified that they originated from isolation of a population of native goats within what is now referred as the "Old English" type.

, there were said to be fewer than 200 registered breeding females.

By May 2018, the Rare Breed Survival Trust Watchlist reported between 200 and 300 registered breeding females.

Uses 

Bagot goats have no commercial purpose being too small by comparison to the Boer Goat to be viable as a meat breed; producing high quality but low volumes of milk (consistent with generally producing a single kid) by comparison to the Swiss dairy breeds, and producing too little cashmere to compete with the Angora.  However, they are good for conservation grazing and have been used at RSPB reserves in Wales, Kent and Canterbury, where their browsing activity promotes diversity in the ground conditions beneficial to other wildlife.. In April 2021 4 young Bagot goats were introduced to the Avon Gorge in Bristol to help control the growth of unwanted scrub on this SSSI and as a supplement the 2 surviving Kashmiri goats originally released for the same purpose in 2011.

Flocks 

A flock is still kept by the Bagot family in the deer park of Levens Hall, Cumbria. Examples can also be seen at:
 Birmingham Wildlife Conservation Park
 Bill Quay Community Farm in Gateshead, Tyne and Wear
 Shugborough Hall in Staffordshire
 Mary Arden's Farm in Warwickshire
 Aldenham Country Park in Hertfordshire
 South of England Rare Breeds Centre
 St James City Farm in Gloucester
 Bagot's Castle, Warwickshire
 Wimpole Home Farm, Cambridgeshire
  Forge Mill Farm, Sandwell Valley Country Park, West Bromwich
 Farmer and television presenter Adam Henson has a flock, started in 1975 by his father, which has featured in his Countryfile appearances.
 Kingston Maurward House, Gardens and Animal Park in Dorset
 On the cliffs of Cromer in Norfolk.
 Ayleswood Rare Breeds in Meikleour, Perthshire
 Hadleigh Farm, in Essex
 Palacerigg Farm Park in Lanarkshire
 Tannaghmore Farm, Northern Ireland
 The LintMill, South Lanarkshire
Staunton Country Park, in Hampshire
 Hartpury University and Hartpury College
Cragend Farm, Rothbury Northumberland: January 2020

The Bagot Goat Society 

The Bagot Goat Society manages the Bagot Goat herd book on behalf of its members and owners of Bagot Goats. It holds an annual show and sale in conjunction with the "Traditional and Native Breeds Show and Sale" at Melton Mowbray Market.

Postage stamps 

An illustration of the species by Harry Titcombe featured on the cover of a 1982 book of British postage stamp, issued from vending machines, at a price of 50p. In January 2005, the breed was featured on a first-class British stamp, one of a set of ten, in a se-tenant block, designed by Rose Design using linocut illustrations by Christopher Wormell.

References

External links

 Bagot Goat Society
 British Goat Society, Bagot page
 Rare Breeds Survival Trust page
 Bagot goat history, by Peter Evans, Secretary, Bagot Goat Breed Society

Goat breeds originating in England
Animal breeds on the RBST Watchlist